Shameema Dev Azad is an Indian singer from Jammu and Kashmir. She is married to Ghulam Nabi Azad, former Chief Minister of Jammu and Kashmir.

She is known for her melodious voice, she was honoured with India's fourth highest civilian award the Padma Shri by Government of India in 2005. She received Kalpana Chawla Excellence Award in 2007. She was also awarded by the Government of Jammu and Kashmir on the Republic Day of 2010 in the field of performing arts.

Personal life
Shameema is one of the eight children of Abdullah Dev. She has six brothers. She is married to Ghulam Nabi Azad since 1980.

References

21st-century Indian singers
21st-century Indian women singers
Living people
Recipients of the Padma Shri in arts
Year of birth missing (living people)
Women musicians from Jammu and Kashmir
Singers from Jammu and Kashmir